Local government in Spain refers to the government and administration of what the Constitution calls "local entities", which are primarily municipalities, but also groups of municipalities including provinces, metropolitan areas, comarcas and mancomunidades and sub-municipal groups known as Minor local entities.

The administration of these entities is mostly provided by a council, each with a different name and set of rules. These councils can be collectively thought of as a third sphere (or tier) of government, the first being the State (Spain) and the second (the regional governments).

For various reasons, local government is heterogeneous, not distributed in a balanced way across the nation, involves duplication of services and has even been labelled dysfunctional. Although Spain adheres to the European Charter of Local Self-Government, it declares itself not bound to the full extent by the requirement for direct elections of all local government authorities.

Governing bodies

Municipal council 

The governing and administrative body for most of the municipalities is the Ayuntamiento The main organ of the Ayuntamiento is the plenary, the deliberative body formed by the elected councillors, and presided by the alcalde. Unlike most European countries the mayor is not directly elected. The mayor is invested(and can be removed) by the councillors.

Open council 

The concejo abierto ("open council") is the system used for the government and administration of low-population municipalities and some minor local entities. The government is exercised by a Mayor and the asamblea vecinal ("neighbourhood assembly"), formed by all the electors of the municipality. The Mayor is elected directly by the citizens.

Provincial council 

Provinces are groupings of municipalities. The governing and administrative body of the mainland provinces is the diputación provincial ("provincial council"). However, when there is only one province in an autonomous community, the functions of the provincial council are replaced by the regional government, for example the autonomous community of the Balearic Islands and the Community of Madrid. A provincial council is made up of a plenary, the deliberative body, and an executive committee formed by the president and the deputies. The provincial councillors are indirectly elected to a 4-year mandate by the municipal councils as function of the results of the municipal elections.

Island council 

In contrast to the rest of Spain, the two provinces of the Canary Islands and the province of the Balearic Islands do not have provincial councils. Instead, each of the seven major islands of the Canaries is administered by a cabildo and the four major islands of the Balearic Islands is administered by a consejo insular.  The functions normally undertaken by a provincial council are divided between the island councils and the regional governments of the respective autonomous communities.

Comarcal council 

Comarcas are groupings of municipalities, established by regional governments, principally in Catalonia, Aragon and the Basque Country but also one in Castile and León. The comarcal council is the local administration and government body in the comarcas.

Metropolitan council 

The Metropolitan Area of Barcelona is governed by a Metropolitan Council made up of representatives of the 36 councils making up its area, including the mayors as ex officio members of the council. It is responsible primarily for public transport, urban planning, water supply and treatment across the metropolitan area.

Others 
There are a variety of other administrative bodies which are highly dependent on the particular regional legislation including:
 Juntaused for some mancomunidades (not to be confused with the governing body of some autonomous communities)
 Junta vecinal used for some minor local entities particularly in Cantabria
 Alcalde pedáneo a single person mayor used for some minor local entities. 
 Concejo used for some minor local entities in Álava in the Basque Country.

Number 

The number of registered local entities in June 2022 is shown in the following table.

References

Bibliography

See also 

 Local government
 Political divisions of Spain

 
Autonomy
Local government
Subdivisions of Spain